Machiloides banksi is a species of rock bristletail, family of basal insects belonging to the order Archaeognatha,  in the genus Machiloides.

References

Archaeognatha
Insects described in 1911